"Star of the County Down" is an Irish ballad set near Banbridge in County Down, in Northern Ireland. The words are by Cathal MacGarvey (1866–1927) from Ramelton, County Donegal. MacGarvey's song was first collected in Herbert Hughes  Irish Country Songs.  The tune is traditional, and may be known as "Dives and Lazarus" or (as a hymn tune) "Kingsfold".

The melody was also used in an Irish folk song called "My Love Nell". The lyrics of "My Love Nell" tell the story of a young man who courts a girl but loses her when she emigrates to America. The only real similarity with "Star of the County Down" is that Nell too comes from County Down. This may have inspired MacGarvey to place the heroine of his new song in Down as well. MacGarvey was from Donegal. The chorus of a similar song, "The Flower of the County Down" names landmarks local to Down, in contrast to those in "Star" which are from across Ireland.  

"The Star of the County Down" uses a tight rhyme scheme. Each stanza is a double quatrain, and the first and third lines of each quatrain have an internal rhyme on the second and fourth feet: [aa]b[cc]b. The refrain is a single quatrain with the same rhyming pattern.

The song is sung from the point of view of a young man who chances to meet a charming lady by the name of Rose (or Rosie) McCann, referred to as the "star of the County Down". From a brief encounter the writer's infatuation grows until, by the end of the ballad, he imagines himself marrying the girl.
	
The song usually begins with the opening verse:

Versions 

 Belfast singer-songwriter Van Morrison recorded a version of the song for the 1988 album Irish Heartbeat, in collaboration with The Chieftains.
 The Pogues recorded a version of the song that was included the 2005 reissue of their 1989 album Peace and Love.
 Canadian singer Loreena McKennitt recorded a version of the song for her 2010 album The Wind That Shakes the Barley.
 Serbian band Orthodox Celts recorded a version of the song for the 1997 album The Celts Strike Again.
 Israeli singer Ehud Banai recorded a Hebrew version of the song titled "Ha-Kochav shel Mechoz Gush Dan" ( or "The Star of Gush Dan District"). It appeared first on his 1998 album Tip Tipa.
 Dublin folk artist Dylan Walshe recorded a live version of the song which appeared on the 2015 album Soul Hell Cafe released on Muddy Roots Records.
 German schlager music band Santiano recorded a version of the song called "Mädchen von Haithabu" with the same melody.
 American folk-jazz band Béla Fleck and the Flecktones included an instrumental arrangement of the song in their 1991 Grammy-nominated album "Flight of the Cosmic Hippo".
 Irish-Canadian band The Irish Rovers recorded versions of the song for the 1996 album Gems and the 2020 Saints and Sinners.
 Irish YouTuber Colm McGuinness uploaded a version of the song to his channel in 2021 titled "The Star of the County Down (Cover)".
 British vocal ensemble The King's Singers recorded an arrangement by Howard Goodall on their albums Watching the White Wheat (1985) and Postcards (2014).
 Irish band The High Kings uploaded a version of the song to their YouTube channel in 2011 titled "Star of the County Down".

References

External links

 Link to a free download of Slainte's version of the song (hosted by archive.org).
 A free sound recording of Droit's version
 

Folk ballads
County Down
Irish folk songs
Performing arts pages with videographic documentation
Traditional Celtic fiddle tunes
Van Morrison songs
Year of song missing
British military marches